Louis Ameka Autchanga (born 3 October 1996) is a Gabonese professional footballer who plays for the Gabon national team as an attacking midfielder.

Career
He has played club football for CF Mounana and Chamois Niortais.

He made his international debut for Gabon in 2017. At the youth level he played in the 2013 African U-17 Championship qualifiers, scoring against Benin, and then the 2015 Africa U-23 Cup of Nations qualifiers.

References

1996 births
Living people
Sportspeople from Libreville
Association football midfielders
Gabonese footballers
Gabon international footballers
Gabon youth international footballers
CF Mounana players
Chamois Niortais F.C. players
Gabon Championnat National D1 players
Ligue 2 players
Championnat National 3 players
Gabonese expatriate footballers
Gabonese expatriate sportspeople in France
Expatriate footballers in France
21st-century Gabonese people
2021 Africa Cup of Nations players